Tea with Mussolini is a 1999 semi-autobiographical comedy-drama war film directed by Franco Zeffirelli, scripted by John Mortimer, telling the story of a young Italian boy's upbringing by a circle of British and American women before and during the Second World War.

At the 53rd British Academy Film Awards, Tea with Mussolini won the BAFTA Award for Best Actress in a Supporting Role (Maggie Smith). The film also nominated for BAFTA Award for Best Costume Design but lost to Sleepy Hollow.

Plot
The film begins in 1935 in Florence, where a group of cultured expatriate English women – the "Scorpioni" – meet for tea every afternoon. Young Luca is the illegitimate son of an Italian businessman who's little interested in his son's upbringing; the boy's seamstress mother has recently died.

Mary Wallace, the man's secretary, steps in to care for Luca, seeking support from her Scorpioni friends, including eccentric would-be artist Arabella. They teach Luca about life and the arts. Elsa Morganthal, a rich young American widow who Scorpioni matron Lady Hester Random barely tolerates, sets up a financial trust for Luca when she hears his mother has died, as she was fond of her and still owes her money for her dressmaking services.

One day when the ladies are having afternoon tea, Italian Fascists disrupt them, reflecting the increasingly uncertain position of the expatriate community. Lady Hester, widow of Britain's former ambassador to Italy, retains an admiring faith in Benito Mussolini. She visits him, receiving his assurances of their safety, and proudly recounts her "tea with Mussolini".

As the political situation continues to deteriorate, the Scorpioni find their status and liberties diminishing. Luca's father decides Italy's future is with Germany rather than Britain, so sends Luca to an Austrian boarding school.

Five years later, Luca plans to study art in Florence with Elsa's trust fund. He finds that most British nationals are fleeing the country, anticipating Mussolini's declaration of war on Great Britain, and that Mary has moved in with Lady Hester and the other English hold-outs. Arriving at the house just as they – and Hester's grandson Wilfred, disguised as a woman – are being transported to the Tuscan town of San Gimignano, he follows.

As the U.S. is not at war, Elsa and her American compatriot Georgie Rockwell, an openly lesbian archaeologist, remain free. Elsa uses Luca to deliver forged orders and funds to have the ladies moved from their barren quarters to an upper class hotel. Believing that Mussolini helped, Lady Hester is delighted, proudly brandishing the newspaper photo of her tea with Il Duce.

As the war progresses, Jewish oppression increases and the Jewish Elsa – protected somewhat by her citizenship and wealth – gets a group of Italian Jews fake passports, enlisting Luca – who is enamored of her – to deliver them. However he becomes jealous when seeing she's involved with Italian lawyer Vittorio.

When the U.S. enters the war in 1941, Elsa and Georgie are interned with the British women. Tricked by Vittorio, who embezzles her art collection and money, he plans to deliver her to the German Gestapo in a phony escape to Switzerland. Luca knows but tells no one out of jealous spite. Mary learns of it from Elsa's art dealer and scolds him.

Luca's attitude changes and he gives his trust fund money to the Italian resistance movement, which Wilfred has joined. Elsa refuses to believe Vittorio's betrayal until Lady Hester, discovering what Elsa has done for all of them, repents and offers gratitude and help. Elsa's escape plan is hatched by Mary, Luca and Wilfred. Before leaving, she tells Luca she supported his young mother to go through with her pregnancy, so he could be there for her.

In July 1944, as the British Army advances toward San Gimignano, Arabella defends her frescoes from demolition by German troops, heroically joined in the line of fire by Georgie and the English women, including Lady Hester. They are saved when the Germans retreat, leaving the women and the towers untouched.

The city rejoices as the Scots Guards arrive, with Luca now serving as their Italian interpreter. The major has orders to evacuate the Scorpioni but Lady Hester refuses, resolved that they will resume their former lives in Italy. Mary is delighted to see that Luca – now in British uniform – has become the "English gentleman" his father wished him to be.

Closing texts explain the mostly happy fates of the characters, concluding with the remark that Luca has become an artist and is the writer and director of the film.

Cast

 Joan Plowright as Mary Wallace, a British expatriate who becomes a surrogate mother for Luca
 Maggie Smith as Lady Hester Random, widow of the former British ambassador to Italy
 Cher as Elsa Morganthal Strauss-Armistan, a wealthy American socialite
 Judi Dench as Arabella, an aspiring artist and art lover
 Lily Tomlin as Georgina 'Georgie' Rockwell, an openly lesbian American archaeologist
 Tessa Pritchard as Connie Raynor, a journalist for The Morning Post
 Baird Wallace as Luca Innocente, as a teenager
 Charlie Lucas as Luca Innocente, as a child
 Paul Chequer as Wilfred 'Lucy' Random, Lady Hester's grandson
 Paolo Seganti as Vittorio Fanfanni, a lawyer and Elsa's lover
 Mino Bellei as Cesare, an art dealer and close friend of Elsa
 Massimo Ghini as Paolo Guarnieri Innocente, Luca's father
 Michael Williams as the British Consul
 Claudio Spadaro as Benito Mussolini
 Pino Colizzi as Dino Grandi
 Paula Jacobs as Molly

Michael Williams, who was married to Judi Dench in real life, died not long after the film was finished. This film marks his last screen appearance.

Production

Angela Lansbury was offered the role of Mary Wallace, but had to drop out when her husband became ill. Lady Hester Random is based upon a real resident of Florence whom Zeffirelli knew in his childhood. Zeffirelli mentions her and a couple of other ladies of the Scorpioni in his autobiography. He said: "I don't remember if she was called Hester, but I remember this terrible, fantastic woman. She was the dowager of the community. I remember the many outrageous things she did because she could afford to be arrogant and bossy."

Reception

The film opened tenth at the U.S. box office with $1,633,183 for the weekend, eventually grossing a worldwide total of $45,566,200, considerably more than its budget. On Rotten Tomatoes, the film holds a rating of 64% from 39 reviews with the consensus: "Tea with Mussolini contains few surprises, but this amiably ambling drama is too likeable – and well-cast – to completely resist." Kevin Thomas of the Los Angeles Times wrote, "There are some scary, somber moments in this lushest of period pieces, yet Zeffirelli wisely sustains a gallant, predominantly blithe spirit throughout. Tea With Mussolini leaves you feeling that, if in reality not everything that Zeffirelli recalls had quite so much dash, whimsy and gallantry, it’s the way it should have been."

Awards and nominations
Won
 2000 – BAFTA Awards – Best Performance by an Actress in a Supporting Role; Maggie Smith.
 2000 – Hollywood Makeup Artist and Hair Stylist Guild Awards – Best Period Hair Styling Feature; Vivian McAteer.
 2000 – Italian National Syndicate of Film Journalists – Best Costume Design (Migliori Costumi); Anna Anni, Alberto Spiazzi.

Nominations
 1999 – Golden Trailer Awards – Best Drama.
 2000 – BAFTA Awards – Best Costume Design; Jenny Beavan, Anna Anni, Alberto Spiazzi.

See also
 The Scorpioni
 Gran Caffè Doney

Footnotes

External links
 
 
 
 Tea with Mussolini filming locations at Movieloci.com

1999 films
Italian drama films
British drama films
1990s English-language films
English-language Italian films
1990s Italian-language films
Films set in Florence
Films directed by Franco Zeffirelli
Films set in the 1940s
Films set in the 1930s
Political drama films
Works by John Mortimer
Films shot in Lazio
Films shot in Tuscany
Films about Benito Mussolini
BAFTA winners (films)
Films about mother–son relationships
Films about parenting
1990s female buddy films
1999 multilingual films
Italian multilingual films
British multilingual films
1990s British films